Sovershenny was one of 18  (officially known as Project 7U) built for the Soviet Navy during the late 1930s. Although she began construction as a Project 7 , Sovershenny was completed in 1941 to the modified Project 7U design. The ship struck a mine while running her acceptance trials in September. While under repair in November, she was hit by two bombs that virtually wrecked her; the Soviets subsequently disarmed her. Repairs resumed in early 1942 until Sovershenny was sunk by an artillery shell in June. Her wreck was scrapped in late 1945.

Design and description 

Originally built as a Gnevny-class ship, Sovershenny and her sister ships were completed to the modified Project 7U design after Joseph Stalin, General Secretary of the Communist Party of the Soviet Union, ordered that the latter be built with their boilers arranged en echelon, instead of linked as in the Gnevnys, so that a ship could still move with one or two boilers disabled.

The crew complement of the Storozhevoy class numbered 207 in peacetime, but this increased to 271 in wartime, as more personnel were needed to operate additional equipment. Each ship had a pair of geared steam turbines, each driving one propeller, rated to produce  using steam from four water-tube boilers, which the designers expected would exceed the  speed of the Project 7s because there was additional steam available. Sovershenny reached  in trials.

The Project 7U-class ships mounted four  B-13 guns in two pairs of superfiring single mounts fore and aft of the superstructure. Anti-aircraft defense was provided by a pair of  34-K anti-aircraft (AA) guns in single mounts and three  21-K AA guns, as well as four  DK or DShK machine guns. They carried six  torpedo tubes in two rotating triple mounts amidships. The ships could also carry a maximum of 58 to 96 mines and 30 depth charges.

Construction and career 
Sovershenny was laid down at Shipyard No. 200 (named after 61 Communards) in Nikolayev as yard number 1073 on 17 September 1936 as a Gnevny-class destroyer with the name Besstrashny. She was relaid down as a Project 7U destroyer in 1938 and launched on 25 February 1939. After launching, she was transferred to Shipyard No. 201 (Sergo Ordzhonikidze) in Sevastopol as yard number 245 for completion. The ship was renamed Sovershenny on 25 September 1940 and was 90% complete when the Germans invaded the Soviet Union on 22 June 1941 (Operation Barbarossa). She began acceptance trials during September. While conducting trials off Chersonesus on 30 September, the day slated for her official acceptance by the navy, she accidentally entered a Soviet minefield. At 16:42, the ship struck a mine that blew a  hole in her hull, which flooded both forward boiler rooms and the forward engine room, in addition to starting a fire in one of the forward boiler rooms. After an attempt by the rescue tug Merkury to pump out the flooded compartments, Sovershenny was towed into the shallows of Kazachya bay for the night due to fears of her sinking from loss of reserve buoyancy. On the next morning, pontoons were placed under the hull and she was towed back to Sevastopol, being placed in a floating dock to patch the hole in her hull on 2 October. The destroyer was subsequently transferred to the drydock of Shipyard No. 201.

During an attack by German aircraft on 12 November, the destroyer was struck by two bombs during a raid by Heinkel He 111s of the First Group of Kampfgeschwader 27 (I./KG 27) and Junkers Ju 88s of KG 51. The bombs broke Sovershennys back, already weakened by the mine explosion, and started extensive fires fueled by remaining oil in her tanks, which burned out her stern. They also damaged the drydock so that it flooded and the water gave the ship a 25° list. Two days later, she was struck by a pair of  artillery shells. Sovershenny was disarmed in early December and her main guns were used to form a coastal artillery battery, positioned on Malakhov kurgan and manned by 65 of her sailors. The drydock was repaired and drained on 20 February 1942, after which repairs resumed, which reconstructed her hull in two months. Sovershenny was removed from drydock in early May and moored in Korabelnaya bay for completion, but in early June she was damaged by several near misses from bombs and another landed in a boiler room. The explosion of a German heavy artillery shell near a starboard boiler room on 15 June holed the ship, causing flooding that tugboats failed to pump out, and Sovershenny sank with only her forward superstructure unsubmerged. After the end of the war, her wreck was refloated by an emergency rescue detachment of the Black Sea Fleet on 28 October 1945; she was deemed irreparable and struck from the Soviet Navy on 27 December of that year, being sent to the Sevastopol Glavvtorchermet base at Inkerman for scrapping.

Notes

Citations

Sources

Further reading

External links 

 Sovershenny photographs

Storozhevoy-class destroyers
1939 ships
Ships built at Shipyard named after 61 Communards
World War II shipwrecks in the Black Sea